The 1956–57 European Cup was the second season of the European Cup, Europe's premier club football tournament. The competition was won for the second time by Real Madrid, who beat Fiorentina 2–0 in the final at the Santiago Bernabéu Stadium, Madrid, on 30 May 1957.

After the great success of the first tournament, six new nations entered representatives: Bulgaria, Czechoslovakia, England, Luxembourg, Romania and Turkey. The English Football Association ("FA") had not allowed Chelsea to enter in 1955, and continued its stance on the European Cup as it being a "distraction". However, against the wishes of the FA, Manchester United entered the competition as English champions, becoming the first English team to play in Europe. An additional place was awarded to Real Madrid as the competition's reigning champions, occupying the free berth left by Saar after its reunification with West Germany. Spain, meanwhile, became the first association to provide two representatives to the premier European competition.

Bracket

Preliminary round

The draw for the preliminary round took place in UEFA headquarters in Paris on 29 June 1956. The 21 challengers of Real Madrid were grouped geographically into three pots. The first four teams drawn in each pot would play the preliminary round in September, while the remaining three clubs received byes.

The calendar was decided by the involved teams, with all matches to be played by 1 October.

|}

First leg

Second leg

Borussia Dortmund 5–5 Spora Luxembourg on aggregate; play-off needed.

Slovan UNV Bratislava won 4–2 on aggregate.

Manchester United won 12–0 on aggregate.

Athletic Bilbao won 5–3 on aggregate.

Nice won 6–2 on aggregate.

Dinamo București won 4–3 on aggregate.

Play-off

First round

|}

1 Second leg played at Heysel Stadium, Brussels

First leg

Second leg

Red Star Belgrade won 6–3 on aggregate

Nice 3–3 Rangers on aggregate; play-off needed.

Real Madrid 5–5 Rapid Wien on aggregate; play-off needed.

Manchester United won 3–2 on aggregate

Fiorentina won 2–1 on aggregate

Grasshopper won 2–1 on aggregate

Athletic Bilbao won 6–5 on aggregate

CDNA Sofia won 10–4 on aggregate

Play-off

Quarter-finals

|}

First leg

Second leg

Manchester United won 6–5 on aggregate

Red Star Belgrade won 4–3 on aggregate

Fiorentina won 5–3 on aggregate

Real Madrid won 6–2 on aggregate

Semi-finals

|}

First leg

Second leg

Fiorentina won 1–0 on aggregate

Real Madrid won 5–3 on aggregate

Final

Top scorers
The top scorers from the 1956–57 European Cup (including preliminary round) were as follows:

Notes

References

External links
1956–57 All matches – season at UEFA website
 All scorers 1956–57 European Cup (excluding qualifying round) according to protocols UEFA + all scorers qualifying round
European Cup results at Rec.Sport.Soccer Statistics Foundation
1956-57 European Cup – results and line-ups (archive)

1956–57 in European football
European Champion Clubs' Cup seasons